is a former Japanese football player and manager. He played for Japan national team.

Club career
Mochizuki was born in Shizuoka on 9 July 1973. After graduating from University of Tsukuba, he joined Nagoya Grampus Eight with teammate Takayuki Nishigaya in 1996. The club won the 2nd place at 1996–97 Asian Cup Winners' Cup. In July 2000, he moved to Kyoto Purple Sanga with Takashi Hirano. However the club was relegated to J2 League, he move to Vissel Kobe in 2001. In 2003, he moved to JEF United Ichihara and in August, he moved to Vegalta Sendai on loan. He returned to JEF United Ichihara in 2004. However he was diagnosed as Idiopathic Osteonecrosis of Femoral Head (ja) in 2004. Although he also played for J2 League club Yokohama FC (2005–06), he could hardly play in the match. He retired in August 2006.

National team career
On 15 June 1997, Mochizuki debuted for Japan national team against Turkey. he played at 1999 Copa América and 2000 Asian Cup. At Asian Cup, he played in 4 games and scored the winning goal in 2000 AFC Asian Cup Final against Saudi Arabia. He was the center of this match for committing a foul led to his team facing a penalty, eventually the Saudis missed out scoring opportunity before himself scored the winning goal. He played 15 games and scored 1 goal for Japan until 2001.

After retirement
After retirement, in February 2008, Mochizuki founded football club SC Sagamihara and became a chairman of the club. In 2011, he also served as manager from June to September.

Club statistics

National team statistics

National team goals

National team
 2000 Asian Cup (Champions)

Honors
 Nagoya Grampus Eight
 Emperor's Cup : 1999

 Japan National Team
 AFC Asian Cup : 2000

References

External links
 
 
 Japan National Football Team Database

1973 births
Living people
University of Tsukuba alumni
Association football people from Shizuoka Prefecture
Japanese footballers
Japan international footballers
J1 League players
J2 League players
Nagoya Grampus players
Kyoto Sanga FC players
Vissel Kobe players
JEF United Chiba players
Vegalta Sendai players
Yokohama FC players
1999 Copa América players
2000 AFC Asian Cup players
AFC Asian Cup-winning players
Japanese football managers
SC Sagamihara managers
Association football midfielders